Michael Stevens Reith (born 2 May 1948) is a former Irish first-class cricketer.

Reith was born at Lurgan in May 1948, and was educated there at Lurgan College. Playing his club cricket for Waringstown, Reith made his debut in first-class cricket for Ireland against Scotland at Perth in 1970. He played first-class cricket for Ireland from 1970–1980, playing in nine first-class matches. He scored a total of 346 runs across his nine matches, with a batting average of 21.62, with a high score of 82. This score, which was one of two first-class half centuries he made, came on debut in 1970. In July 1980, Reith played in Ireland's  first-ever List A match against Middlesex in the Gillette Cup at Lord's. Opening the batting alongside Jack Short, Reith became the first Irishman to be dismissed for a duck in List A cricket, when he was dismissed first ball by Wayne Daniel. Outside of cricket, he worked as a manager in the leisure industry.

References

External links

1948 births
Living people
People from Lurgan
People educated at Lurgan College
Cricketers from Northern Ireland
Irish cricketers